Stephen Carlile is a British actor well known for starring as the villain Scar in the Broadway musical adaptation of the Disney film The Lion King.

Early life
Born in Bath, Somerset, England, Carlile was trained in acting at the Guildford School of Acting.

Career
Carlile has performed in many theatre works including the Broadway production of The Lion King as Scar, Noël (National Opera House in Ireland), the West End production of The Go-Between as Viscount Trimingham, as Captain Hook in the US national tour of Peter Pan 360, as Agustín Magaldi in Evita, lead tenor singing Springtime for Hitler in the West End production of The Producers, Peter Pan as Smee, The Wizard of Oz, My Fair Lady as Freddy Eynsford-Hill, Next Door's Baby as Dickie O' Brien, The Pirates of Penzance as Frederic,  Space Family Robinson and The Phantom of the Opera.

Carlile has featured in several radio plays including Doctor Who, Songs from Jesus Christ Superstar and Vanity Fair.

Carlile also appeared in the 2008 film Brideshead Revisited.

Theatre credits
 The Lion King (Minskoff Theatre)
 Noël (National Opera House)
 The Go-Between (Apollo Theatre)
 Peter Pan: A Musical Adventure (Birmingham Repertory Theatre)
 Peter Pan 360 (US Tour)
 Bridget Jones' Diary (Working Title workshop)
 Evita (European Tour)
 Twelfth Night (Creation Theatre Company)
 The Wizard of Oz (New Vic Theatre)
 Next Door's Baby (Orange Tree Theatre)
 Park Avenue (Sadler's Wells Theatre)
 By Jeeves (Eastbourne tour)
 My Fair Lady (Royal National Theatre)
 The Producers (Theatre Royal, Drury Lane)
 The Importance of Being Earnest (Jermyn Street)
 The Lion King (European Tour)
 The Pirates of Penzance (Orange Tree Theatre)
 The Phantom of the Opera (Her Majesty's Theatre)
 Over My Shoulder (Yvonne Arnaud Theatre, Guildford tour)
 Snoopy! The Musical (Jermyn Street Theatre)
 Coward in Concert (Covent Garden)
  Space Family Robinson (The Pleasance)

References

External links
 
 Stephen Carlile at Spotlight Casting Directory

21st-century English male actors
People from Bath, Somerset
English male musical theatre actors
English male stage actors
English male film actors
Alumni of the Guildford School of Acting
Living people
1978 births